The discography of Arash, a singer, songwriter and producer, consists of three studio albums, remix album, compilation album, 24 singles and two featured singles.

Albums

Studio albums

Remix albums

Singles

As featured artist

Music videos

References

External links
 

Discographies of Iranian artists
Discographies of Swedish artists
Pop music discographies